Anthony or Tony Murray may refer to:

Anthony Murray (New Zealand rugby league) (1958/9–2006), New Zealand rugby league player and coach
Anthony Murray (rugby league, born 1977), rugby league coach and player
Anthony Murray, a character on the TV show Brookside between 2000 and 2003
Tony Murray (businessman) (born 1920), French-born British billionaire businessman
Tony Murray (baseball) (1904–1974), outfielder in Major League Baseball
Tony Murray (judge) (1917–1999), a Judge of the Supreme Court of Victoria